Sir Henry Holland Mission Eye Hospital, also known as Sir Henry Eye Clinic, and Hiranand Charitable Eye Hospital, is an eye hospital located in Shikarpur, Sindh. It is named after Sir Henry Holland.

History
The hospital was founded in 1909 by Sir Henry Holland with the financial support of Seth Heeranand. After the death of Henry Holland, the hospital was visited by his son, Harry Henry, annually for eye checkups. Since its foundation, more than 150,000 eye operations have been performed.

References

Shikarpur District
1909 establishments in British India
Hospitals in Sindh